Villeherviers is a commune in the Loir-et-Cher department in central France.

Geography
The Rère flows northwest through the eastern part of the commune, then flows into the Sauldre, which flows southwest through the middle of the commune.

Population

See also
Communes of the Loir-et-Cher department

References

Communes of Loir-et-Cher